Jinichiro Kozuma (born 7 July 1994) is a Japanese professional golfer. He has played primarily on the Japan Golf Tour since 2012, where he was won twice; at the 2020 Mitsui Sumitomo Visa Taiheiyo Masters and the 2022 Token Homemate Cup.

Professional wins (4)

Japan Golf Tour wins (2)

Japan Golf Tour playoff record (1–0)

Japan Challenge Tour wins (1)

Other wins (1)
2021 Kyusyu Open

Results in major championships

CUT = missed the half-way cut

References

External links
 
 
 
 

Japanese male golfers
Japan Golf Tour golfers
LIV Golf players
Sportspeople from Kagoshima Prefecture
1994 births
Living people